Aski Baghdad (also Romanized as Askī Baghdād; also known as Askalī Baghdād) is a village in Il Gavark Rural District, in the Central District of Bukan County, West Azerbaijan Province, Iran. At the 2006 census, its population was 325, in 61 families.

References 

Populated places in Bukan County